Máximo González won in the final 6–4, 6–4, against Guillermo Hormazábal.

Seeds

Draw

Final four

Top half

Bottom half

References

External links
Main Draw
Qualifying Draw

Challenger ATP Iquique